This is a list of flag bearers who have represented Thailand at the Olympics.

Flag bearers carry the national flag of their country at the opening ceremony of the Olympic Games.

See also
Thailand at the Olympics

References

Thailand at the Olympics
Thailand
Olympic flagbearers
Olympic flagbearers